The Strange Case of Dr. Jekyll and Mr. Hyde is a 2006 adaptation of Robert Louis Stevenson's 1886 novella.  It was directed by John Carl Buechler, and produced by Peter Davy. The film is set in modern times instead of Victorian England.

Plot

Dr. Henry Jekyll has succeeded in curing a higher primate of his serious heart condition. He tests the serum on himself, resulting in dire consequences; he is transformed into the evil Edward Hyde. Dr. Jekyll does not realize that Hyde is a manifestation of himself, and develops a kind of multiple personality disorder. Hyde murders female college students and frames Jekyll. Jekyll feels guilty about the murders, and gives the victims' families $30,000 in damages. Hyde rapes and murders Jekyll's boss, Donna Carew.

During a dinner party, Jekyll's friend Dennis Lanyon sees his colleague transform into Hyde before his eyes. Detective Karen Utterson and Lanyon race to find Jekyll before it's too late, as the serum gives Hyde immortality. Jekyll tries giving himself up to the police, but Hyde won't allow him to go to prison, knowing he will be executed: If Jekyll dies, so does Hyde.

Jekyll commits suicide by jumping off the roof of the hospital, in order to make sure that Hyde will never hurt anyone ever again. As Jekyll dies, he says "It was for my soul."

Cast 
 Tony Todd as Dr. Henry Jekyll / Edward Hyde
 Tracy Scoggins as Karen Utterson
 Vernon Wells as Dr. Dennis Lanyon
 Rebecca Grant as Linda Santiago
 Judith Shekoni as Renée
 Danielle Nicolet as Whitney Weddings
 Arloa Reston as Gloria Hatten
 Stefanie Budiman as Whitney's body double
 John Paul Fedele as Alan Ballard
 Paula Ficara as Dominio Hunter
 Peter Jason as Lt. Hamilton
 Marie Louise Jones as Valet
 Howard Kahen as Perkins
 Tyler Kain as Colleen Woodbe
 Miranda Kwok as Stacy Li
 Michelle Lee as Kim Li
 Justin Levin as Jesse
 Peter Lupus III as Gerald Poole
 Elina Madison as Cindy shivers
 Clayton Martinez as Arnold
 Mike Muscat as Night Watchman
 Grant Reynolds as Security Guard
 Deborah Shelton as Donna Carew
 Jacob Tawney as Kelsey James
 Tim Thomerson as Arnie Swift
 Nicholle Tom as Carla Hodgkiss
 Stephen Wastell as Richard Enfield
 Chris Kerner as Paramedic (uncredited)
 Ben Solenberger as Student at Opera House Restaurant (uncredited)

Release
The film was released on DVD by Image Entertainment on May 20, 2008.

Reception
Critical reception for the film has been negative. Jon Condit from Dread Central awarded the film  a score of 2.5 out of 5 stating, "While this latest variation of the Jekyll story isn't likely to win over any enthusiasts of the book, it will probably satisfy the undiscerning fan looking for some blood and a few unintentional laughs".
DVD Verdict gave the film a negative review criticizing the film's lack of atmosphere, pacing and the film's ending.

References

External links 
 
 
 

2006 films
2006 horror films
Dr. Jekyll and Mr. Hyde films
Films directed by John Carl Buechler
American science fiction horror films
2000s monster movies
2000s English-language films
2000s American films